Associated Argentine Artists (Spanish: Artistas Argentinos Asociados, AAA) was a leading Argentine film distribution company. It emerged during the Golden Age of Argentine Cinema and was modeled on the Hollywood company United Artists. One of the first films released by the company following its creation was The Gaucho War (1942).

References

Bibliography
 Rist, Peter H. Historical Dictionary of South American Cinema. Rowman & Littlefield, 2014.

Film studios
Film distributors
Film organisations in Argentina